Wellesley House School is a private day and boarding preparatory school in the coastal town of Broadstairs in the English county of Kent. Founded in 1866, it educates boys and girls aged 3 to 13.

History
The history of Wellesley House School dates back to 1866. It was originally called Conyngham House and was located at Ramsgate. During World War II, the school was temporarily evacuated to Rannoch in Scotland while the buildings were used by the British Army. In 1969 it merged with St Peter's Court, another local prep school. Originally a typical boys-only boarding prep school, girls were admitted in 1977.

Academics
As with prep schools that educate children up to age 13, Wellesley House prepares pupils for the Common Entrance Examination.

Boarding
Wellesley House offers full, weekly and flexi boarding options for all pupils. Girls from all year groups live in Orchard House. Both houses are supervised by live-in "houseparents". Boys reside in the main school building and are looked after by the Headmaster and his wife. As of 2020, the boys and girls both reside in the main school but separately.

Former pupils
Former pupils are known as "Old Welleslians". This list includes former pupils from St Peter's Court, which closed in 1969 and merged with Wellesley House.

Armed Forces
 Peter de la Billière, former Commander-in-Chief of British Forces in the 1990 Gulf War
 Sir Henry Leach, former First Sea Lord at the time of the 1982 Falklands War who convinced Margaret Thatcher to re-take the islands
 John Ruggles-Brise, Honorary Colonel in the Territorial Army

The Arts
 Reginald Bosanquet, former ITN newscaster on ITV
 Sir Jeremy Child, actor
 Pandora Clifford, actress 
 Michael Denison, actor
 Siobhan Hewlett, actress 
 Patrick Anson, 5th Earl of Lichfield, photographer
 Oliver Preston, cartoonist 
 Sir Jocelyn Stevens, Chairman of English Heritage
 Heathcote Williams, poet, playwright, actor and anarchist

Business
 Neil Sclater-Booth, former New York City financier
 John Cobbold
 Patrick Cobbold
 Robin Leigh-Pemberton, former Governor of the Bank of England
 Sir Adrian Swire, Hong Kong-based billionaire

Politics
 James Arbuthnot, Conservative MP
 Sir John Arbuthnot, 1st Bt, former Conservative MP
 Henry Bellingham, Conservative MP 
 Lord Jellicoe, former First Lord of the Admiralty 
 Ian Liddell-Grainger, Conservative MP
 Nicholas Lyell, former Conservative MP

Royalty and nobility
 Prince Henry, Duke of Gloucester
 Prince George, Duke of Kent
 Prince William of Gloucester
 Prince Richard, Duke of Gloucester
Henry Alan Walter Richard Percy, 11th Duke of Northumberland
Ralph George Algernon Percy, 12th Duke of Northumberland

Sportsmen and sportswomen
 Graham Cowdrey, former cricketer
 Chris Cowdrey, former cricketer
 Oliver Sherwood, National Hunt racing trainer
 William Fox-Pitt, Silver Medal-winning Olympic equestrian competitor 
 Georgina Harland, Bronze Medal-winning Olympic athlete
 Alex Loudon, former cricketer
 George Mann, former cricketer
 Tony Nash, Gold Medal-winning Olympic bobsleigh competitor
 Sam Northeast, Hampshire cricketer and former Kent Captain
 Jordan Cox, Kent cricketer
 Ollie Robinson, Sussex cricketer

Writers
 Simon Astaire, author, agent and media advisor
 David Goodhart, political commentator and founder of Prospect
 Jonathon Porritt, environmental journalist
 Tom Stacey, novelist and former foreign correspondent
 Hew Strachan, military historian

References

External links
Official Website
Profile on the ISC website

1866 establishments in England
Boarding schools in Kent
Broadstairs
Church of England private schools in the Diocese of Canterbury
Educational institutions established in 1866
Preparatory schools in Kent